The 2019 Campeonato Paraense was the 107th edition of Pará's top professional football league. The competition started on 19 January and ended on 21 April. Remo won the championship for the 46th time.

Format
The competition will consist of two groups of five teams each, who will face off in round games and back against the other key times in a single turn. The top two will contest the semi-finals in their respective groups, thereby defining the two championship finalists. The losers of the semifinals will make two matches to decide the third place. Semifinal and final matches will round trip.

The worst placed of each group will be relegated to the Second Division.

The champion and the best placed team not qualified via CBF ranking qualify to the 2020 Copa Verde. The champion, the runner-up and the 3rd-placed team qualify to the 2020 Copa do Brasil. The best two teams who isn't on Campeonato Brasileiro Série A, Série B or Série C qualifies to 2020 Campeonato Brasileiro Série D.

Participating teams

Group stage

Group A1

Group A2

Final stage

Semi-finals

Semi-final 1

Remo won 1–0 on aggregate and advanced to the finals.

Semi-final 2

Independente won 3–2 on aggregate and advanced to the finals.

Third place play-off

Finals

References

Pará
Campeonato Paraense